Sent og tidlig is the seventh studio album by Norwegian rock band deLillos. It was released as a double-disc album.

Track listing
Disc one :
"God morgen"
"Uten deg"
"På perrongen"
"Geometri"
"Lille du (bonus track)"
"Grål"
"Mobiltelefon"
"Toddys tupé"
"Festreligiøs"
"Denne gangen meg"

Disc two:
"Blodig blues på Cruise Café"
"Mandarinskall"
"Månemann"
"Sang fra en skrivebordsskuff"
"Nå lever den av seg selv"
"Adeleine"
"Smak av honning"
"Ingen blir klok av skade"
"God natt"

1995 albums
DeLillos albums
Sonet Records albums